Dippach is a village and a former municipality in the Wartburgkreis district of Thuringia, Germany. Since 1 January 2019, it is part of the town Werra-Suhl-Tal.

References

Wartburgkreis
Former municipalities in Thuringia